Urradhi is a Paman language of the Cape York Peninsula of Queensland, Australia, and is apparently extinct. It was spoken by the Urradhi people.  Urradhi proper is the south-western dialect of the language.  The name is composed of urra "this" and the proprietive dhi "having". The south-eastern dialect of the same language, Wudhadhi, is made of the same elements, wudha being "this". These are part of a group of closely related and highly mutually intelligible dialects, these being Angkamuthi to the north of Urradhi, Atampaya inland from these, Utudhanamu inland north from Atampaya, Yantaykenu further north, being the language of the Bamaga area, Yadhaykenu on the east coast north of Wudhadhi, and Yaraytyana further north again. (Adyinuri/Itinadyana may have been another.) This group has no common language name, though Urradhi is commonly used as a cover name. It is unknown when it became extinct.

The Urradhi dialects are closely related to the Gudang language (Pantyinamu/Yatay/Gudang/Kartalaiga and other clan names), formerly spoken on the tip of Cape York.

The traditional language region includes north of Mapoon and Duyfken Point and east of the coast strip to the north of Port Musgrave (Angkamuthi country) incorporating the mouth of the Ducie River, the lower reaches of the Dulhunty River and the upper reaches of the Skardon River in the north. Following the displacement of Indigenous people by British settlement, it was also spoken in the Northern Peninsula Area Region including the communities of New Mapoon, Injinoo and Cowal Creek.

Phonology

Vowels 
Uradhi has seven phonemic vowels:

Consonants 
Uradhi has 18 consonants:

References

Notes

General 
 

 

Northern Paman languages
Extinct languages of Queensland